Driftwood Branch Sinnemahoning Creek  is a tributary of Sinnemahoning Creek in the U.S. state of Pennsylvania. This stream once called simply "Driftwood Creek" was so named for the driftwood which accumulated there.

Course and tributaries

Clear Creek, then North Creek, join the Driftwood Branch downstream of the community of Rich Valley.

West Creek joins downstream at the borough of Emporium, Cameron County, Pennsylvania.

See also
List of rivers of Pennsylvania

References

External links
U.S. Geological Survey: PA stream gaging stations

Rivers of Pennsylvania
Tributaries of the West Branch Susquehanna River
Rivers of Elk County, Pennsylvania
Rivers of Cameron County, Pennsylvania